Brunei National Solidarity Party (PPKB) was a political party in Brunei. Although legally registered as a political party, it was not able to gain electoral representation as legislative elections had not been held in Brunei since 1962.

The party was registered in 1986 as the first legal political party since independence but was banned in 1988. In 1995, formal authorisation was given to hold a convention and Abdul Latif Chuchu, the former secretary-general of the Brunei National Democratic Party, was elected as its president. In 2002, Dr Hj Mohd Hatta Hj Zainal Abidin was elected the party president.

The objectives of the party included advocating a representative government chosen by the citizens, freedom of speech and the fair and equitable distribution of wealth. In early 2006, the party's president declared that its objectives are consistent with Brunei's national philosophy of Malay Islamic Monarchy.

The party was deregistered in 2007 or 2008.

Political parties in Brunei
Monarchist parties